is a former Japanese football player.

Playing career
Nemoto was born in Tsuruoka on August 24, 1980. After graduating from high school, he joined newly was promoted to J2 League club, Montedio Yamagata based in his local in 1999. He played many matches as forward from first season. The club won the 2nd place in 2008 and was promoted to J1 League first time in club history. However he retired end of 2008 season without playing J1.

Club statistics

References

External links

1980 births
Living people
Association football people from Yamagata Prefecture
Japanese footballers
J2 League players
Montedio Yamagata players
Association football forwards